Bolinaquinone is a hydroxyquinone marine metabolite. It is known for having potent anti-inflammatory activity.

References

1,4-Benzoquinones
Bicyclic compounds
Phenol ethers
Hydroxybenzoquinones
Methoxy compounds